JKT48 (read as "J. K. T. forty-eight") is an Indonesian-Japanese idol girl group whose name is derived from its based city of Jakarta and the Japanese idol group AKB48. Formed in 2011, the group is the first AKB48 sister group outside Japan and adopts the concept of "idols you can meet", before switching to "idols that will come to meet you" since April 8, 2018. The group opened their own theater in the 4th floor of fX Sudirman shopping mall in early September 2012, where fans can attend daily performances (except on Monday). The theater was built as a close replica to the AKB48 Theater in Akihabara.

While JKT48 does not restrict membership by nationality, applicants must be residents of Indonesia. As of 18 March 2023, the group has 45 individual members.

On 16 February 2013, JKT48 released its first studio album Heavy Rotation via Hits Records, a division of MNC subsidiary PT Star Media Nusantara. The group typically performs songs of AKB48 and other sister groups that are translated into Indonesian. The group released their first original single, Rapsodi, in January 2020.

Conception 
Much like AKB48, the female Japanese idol group formed in 2005 in Akihabara, Tokyo, JKT48 is based on the concept of idols with whom fans can "'meet', or at least develop a similar feeling of intimacy". JKT48 takes its name from the group's base city of Jakarta, Indonesia. The country was seen as a potential market for the idol business because of its relatively young population— about half are under the age of 30—and the popularity of Japanese manga series, such as Slam Dunk and One Piece. In order to bring the concept of AKB48 to Indonesia, producer Yasushi Akimoto and Dentsu Media Group Indonesia partnered with the country's largest media conglomerate, Global Mediacom, and Rakuten.

In an interview on CNN's TalkAsia program, Akimoto responded to the question of why he selected Indonesia as the first target of AKB48's overseas expansion: "People in Indonesia were interested in AKB48. That is why we decided to try it in Jakarta. Kids watched AKB on the internet and they want to do the same, but they don't know whether they have talent. Also it's difficult [for them] to go to Japan to audition." Then Rakuten–MNC chief marketing officer Reino Barack and Arya Sinulingga recounted of his visit to Japan: "When I watched AKB48's theater performance in Akihabara, I sensed the potential for a new business in Indonesia."

History

2011–2012: Formation 

On 11 September 2011, the formation of JKT48 was announced at an AKB48 event held at Makuhari Messe in Chiba, Japan. Applicant interviews took place the following weeks, in late September 2011, and the first auditions were held a month after the initial announcement, from 8–9 October 2011. AKB48 member Minami Takahashi also visited Jakarta during the audition to promote JKT48 among fans of AKB48. Although applicants did not have to be Indonesian citizens, they did have to already reside in the country. Approximately 1,200 girls auditioned for the group, and 51 were selected to proceed to the second round. Finalists were judged based on their dance performance of "Heavy Rotation", from AKB48's single of the same name, and their performance of a song of their choice. JKT48's 28 first generation members, ages 12–21, were selected on 2 November 2011.

On 17 December 2011, JKT48 made its first public appearance on the live music program 100% Ampuh on Global TV, performing "Heavy Rotation", with lyrics translated into Indonesian.

As part of the concept of "idols you can meet every day", AKB48 performs daily at its theater in Akihabara. The JKT48 management team aimed to accomplish this same principle and began scouting locations in Jakarta for the group's own theater in early 2012. An unoccupied site in the fX Sudirman shopping mall was selected as the theater's eventual location, and planning for its renovation began in April. In the meantime, the first theater performances were held 17–20 May 2012 at a temporary stage in the Nyi Ageng Serang Building in Kuningan, Jakarta. The official theater opened on 8 September 2012 for daily performances with a set list of 16 songs that have been translated into Indonesian. The theater first had a seating capacity of 180 and standing room for 30, and its design is a close replica of the AKB48 Theater. Currently it holds around 350 people, both seated and standing.

JKT48 has also performed in Japan alongside other AKB48 sister groups. In its first performance in Japan, the group was a surprise guest at 2011 AKB48 Kōhaku Taikō Uta Gassen and performed the Indonesian version of "Aitakatta". It also performed alongside AKB48 and other sister groups at the 62nd NHK Kōhaku Uta Gassen with a total 210 members onstage. It also participated in the 2012 AKB48 concerts at Saitama Super Arena and Tokyo Dome.

On 13 August 2012, management began accepting applications for second generation members. Of the 4,500 applicants, approximately 200 were selected for interviews the following month. The pool was then narrowed down from 67 to 31 in a selection round held by RCTI. All 31 finalists were eventually chosen as second generation members at a final audition on 3 November in Japan. Additionally, AKB48 members Aki Takajō and Haruka Nakagawa, whose transfers to JKT48 were announced at the Tokyo Dome concert, officially began their activities with the group on 1 November and made their theater debut on 26 December. Nakagawa became interested in Jakarta during a visit with other members of AKB48 earlier in February 2012.

2013–2020: Ups and downs 

JKT48 was scheduled to release its debut album in January 2013, but production was hampered because of flooding in Jakarta. To celebrate the release, the group's management team had distributed 100,000 free CD singles. Each single featured an Indonesian version of one of four songs: "Heavy Rotation"; "Kimi no Koto ga Suki Dakara"; "Baby! Baby! Baby!"; and "Ponytail to Shushu". Members, some of whom had been directly affected by the flooding, later held a charity event in order to raise funds for the city's relief efforts. The debut album, entitled Heavy Rotation, had a limited release at the JKT48 Theater on 16 February 2013 and went on sale in music stores nationwide on 2 March. All of the four songs aforementioned were included in the album. Throughout 2013, JKT48 released four singles: "River" (11 May), "Apakah Apakah Kau Melihat Mentari Senja?" (3 July), "Fortune Cookie yang Mencinta" (21 August), and "Musim Panas Sounds Good!" (26 November). The third single was released concurrently with its parent group AKB48.

On 28 January 2014, JKT48 announced the names of 63 finalists who were vying to become JKT48 trainees in the third generation. On 15 February, the group announced and performed its fifth single "Flying Get". On 24 February 2014, Rina Chikano was transferred from AKB48 to JKT48, with Aki Takajo and Rena Nozawa's concurrent positions were cancelled.

On 26 April 2014, JKT48 finished its first annual senbatsu election, with the 16 ranked members going to appear in JKT48's 6th single, Gingham Check, released on 11 June 2014. On 27 August 2014 the group released "Papan Penanda Isi Hati", with Shania Junianatha taking the center position for the first time, and Rina Chikano and Thalia Ivanka Elizabeth appearing in the senbatsu for the first time. The single was released concurrently with AKB48, the second consecutive year of such. The group's 8th single, "Angin Sedang Berhembus", was released on 24 December 2014.

On 20 February 2015, JKT48 held a collaboration concert with AKB48 in Jakarta. 15 members of AKB48 was sent to Jakarta for the concert, including Yui Yokoyama, Rie Kitahara and Asuka Kuramochi. On 27 March 2015, JKT48 released its 9th single, Pareo wa Emerald.

On 2 May 2015, JKT48 held its second senbatsu election, with the 16 ranking members are featured in the group's 10th single Kibōteki Refrain, Jessica Veranda displaced Melody Laksani to win the election. On 26 August 2015, JKT48 released its 11th single, Halloween Night, the third consecutive year of concurrent single release with AKB48.

On 21 March 2017, JKT48 general manager Jiro Inao committed suicide by hanging at his house in South Tangerang, Banten, Indonesia, possibly due to "work pressure".

In an attempt to attract young spectators, the Indonesia Asian Games Organizing Committee (INASGOC) collaborated with the group during the 2018 Asian Games. They performed in select sporting events between 19 August and 1 September in a group consisted of eight members from each of its teams.

JKT48 announced  that it had got the green light for its first original single during their 7th anniversary concert on 22 December 2018, and the selected members were chosen nearly a year later through the annual election. The song, entitled "", was first performed during their 8th anniversary concert in Surabaya, exactly a year after the announcement, and was released on 22 January 2020.

2020–present: Following the COVID-19 pandemic
Amid the COVID-19 pandemic in Indonesia, one Team T member named Flora Shafiqa Riyadi was announced to be positive for the disease on 28 September 2020. Over the next month, two more members of the team had also been announced to be positive as well.

In November 2020, JKT48 announced it would forcibly mass-graduate its members and staffs following the group's crisis due to the pandemic. The group had previously announced the 10th generation members of the group, consisted of 11 members, but cancelled their debut following the announcement. On 11 January 2021, the group announced 26 of its members would leave the group, leaving only 33 members. They officially left the group mid-March 2021. All three teams were then dissolved and the academy stopped its operation.

On 18 December 2021, the group re-introduced 8 of the 11 tenth generation members. It also announced its 23rd and second original single, to be produced by Matt Rad and August Rigo, who previously worked with world-renowned groups like Boyz II Men, BTS, Little Mix, NCT Dream, One Direction, and Pentatonix, as well as soloists Baekhyun, Justin Bieber, Chris Brown, Martin Garrix, Selena Gomez, Sean Kingston, Demi Lovato, Olly Murs, Meghan Trainor, and Keith Urban. The single, titled "", was released on 17 June 2022.

Members 

As of 18 March 2023, the group individually consists of 45 members: 24 members from the pre-pandemic era, 8 trainees from the tenth generation, and 14 trainees from the eleventh generation.

Discography

Singles

Studio albums

Greatest hits album

Filmography

Films

Television shows

Promotion and media 
JKT48 follows its Japanese sister group AKB48 in order to boost the record sales through a variety of marketing strategies. The main track for each single is sung by a team of  consisting of popular members from JKT48's teams, with one of the girls selected as the center performer or Center. The singles and albums are released in different types with alternate type and voting codes for annual election contests. Alan Swarts of MTV Japan has noted that collectors purchasing multiple copies of AKB48 CDs have inflated the market, and is one of the reasons Japan's music industry has been booming. Six elections have been held; most recently in 2019.

JKT48 is billed as a "unique idol group with Indonesian culture". Harris Thayeb, President Director of the group's promotional agent Dentsu Media Group Indonesia, believed the group's concept "will make our idols more down to earth, being always nice and able to be greeted anytime". The group was seen as part of the "Cool Japan" brand adopted by the Japanese government to promote the country's culture around the world.

On 25 February 2012, JKT48 held a joint concert with AKB48 at the Japan Pop Culture Festival at Balai Kartini in Jakarta. The event was sponsored by the Embassy of Japan, the Japanese Agency for Cultural Affairs, and the Indonesian Ministry of Tourism and Creative Economy. According to Junji Shimada, deputy to the Japanese ambassador, AKB48 was invited to perform because of its status as a Japanese pop icon, and the two sister groups represent the friendship between Japan and Indonesia.

JKT48 appeared in television shows almost daily after its debut and in television advertisements by Japanese companies that intend to capture a share of the rapidly growing Indonesian market. Otsuka Pharmaceutical hired JKT48 to promote the company's Pocari Sweat beverages one month after the group's first members were announced. Sharp Corporation selected JKT48 to appear at the company's promotional events, and Yamaha Motor Company hired the group in order to promote its line of fuel efficient Mio J scooters to Indonesian teens. Ezaki Glico also featured the group in its advertisements as part of an effort to grow sales in Indonesia to over Rp1 billion.

Teenagers and single young men make up the largest portion of the JKT48 and AKB48 fan base. Furthermore, some believe JKT48's idol concept does not fit the Indonesian culture.

Elections

Awards

See also 
 List of JKT48 performances

References 
Footnotes

News sources

 
 
 
 
 
 
 
 
 
 
 
 
 
 
 
 
 
 
 
 
 
 
 
 
 
 
 
 
 

Web sources

Bibliography

External links 

  
Jkt48 Official Live Streaming on Goplay

 
2011 establishments in Indonesia
Musical groups established in 2011
Indonesian-language singers
English-language singers from Indonesia
Indonesian girl groups
AKB48 Group
Musical groups from Jakarta
Anugerah Musik Indonesia winners